Urumqi Confucius temple, or Urumqi Confucian Temple, is a Confucian temple located at No. 15, north side of Qianjin Road (前进路), Tianshan District, Urumqi City, Xinjiang Uygur Autonomous Region. Built in the late Qing dynasty, Urumqi Confucius Temple is the only well-preserved Qing dynasty style temple complex in Xinjiang, and is the only remaining Confucian temple in Xinjiang.

The Urumqi Confucius temple was built on Culture Road (previously Confucius Temple Lane) in 1765–1767, when the Qing Government expanded the Dihua New City (迪化新城, now Urumqi City). Originally known as the God Temple (上帝庙), Urumqi Confucius Temple was rebuilt in the Eleventh year of the Republic of China (1922), dedicated mainly to God and secondarily to Confucius. In 1945, the main hall of the God Temple was rebuilt as the Confucius Dacheng Hall (孔子大成殿).

In 1979, Urumqi Confucius Temple was listed as a municipal-level cultural relic protection unit in Urumqi. In October 2019, Urumqi Confucius Temple was included as the eighth batch of the China's Major Historical and Cultural Site Protected at the National Level.

History
In 1769, Wen Fuzeng, the then-minister of affairs in Urumqi, made a memorial, and planned to build a school and a Confucian Temple in Dihua city. That spring, when the Confucian temple was not yet completed, the spring memorial ceremony began. This was the first time that the Confucian sacrifice ceremony was held in Dihua in the Qing dynasty. In 1773, the Confucian temple was established on the east of Dongguanxiang Street, and the construction of school palaces began in various parts of Xinjiang. However, due to the war that started in 1864, most of the Confucian temples and schools built during the Qianlong period were destroyed. A few remaining were converted into mosques. With the victory of the Qing army led by Zuo Zongtang, the Qing government restored its dominance in Xinjiang. In 1879, Zhou Chongfu, Yin of Zhendi Road, built the Confucian Temple on Chengxi Street. In 1890, the Qing government rebuilt the Dihua Confucian temple into an ancient building with a certain scale. Every spring and autumn, officials of the Qing government organized a ceremony to worship Confucius in the Confucian temple.

After the founding of the Republic of China, the ruler of Xinjiang, Yang Zengxin, also made sacrifices to Confucianism at the Dihua Confucian temple. In 1922, in order to widen Zhixi Street where the Confucian temple was located, the Confucian temple was moved to Xinmancheng East Street, inside the East Gate of Dihua City at that time.

Because Yang Zengxin's "Sacrificing Heaven" believed that the worship of heaven advocated by Confucianism and the God of Jesus in Christianity, and the Allah believed in by Islam and Muhammad  all worship the god of heaven, and there are not two days, so there are not two religions, so all believers can worship one God. Therefore, Yang Zengxin changed the name of the Confucian temple to "God Temple". After Sheng Shicai came to power, the temples in Dihua City were repurposed for other uses, and the property and land of the temples were handed over to the Han Nationality Cultural Promotion Association. In 1933, the Temple of God was converted into a warehouse. After the Kuomintang took over Xinjiang, in July of the 34th year of the Republic of China (AD 1945), the Temple of God was renovated into a Confucian temple, and the offering of sacrifices to Confucius was resumed. Some documents say that the Temple of God was formerly known as the Huanghua Pavilion, the Longevity Palace or the Martyrs' Shrine. Some scholars have studied its functions, the places of worship and its location, etc., and they believe that the Confucian Temple is the same as the Huanghua Pavilion in these aspects. Longevity Palace or Martyrs' Shrine are not the same, these claims may be misrepresented. In September 1991, the Urumqi City Museum opened the Confucian Temple as its site for the first time. The museum is affiliated to the Urumqi City Cultural Bureau.

Building
The Confucian temple in Urumqi and most other Confucian temples are not consistent in the ritual system. Most of the Confucian temples have three-entry courtyards, while the Urumqi Confucian temple only has two-entry courtyards. The area is also much smaller than other famous Confucian temples, only about 2800 square meters, with a construction area of 900 square meters. The main buildings are Shanmen, Front Hall, Dacheng Hall, East Hall, West Hall, Bell Tower, Drum Tower, etc. The front hall is Guandi Hall, Shanmen, Guandi Hall, East Hall, West Hall and Bell and Drum Tower constitute the first courtyard. Dacheng Hall, Liyue Hall and other buildings constitute the second courtyard, which is less than other Confucian temples. Similar to other Confucian temples, the Urumqi Confucian temple is also highly symmetrical with the central axis as the benchmark. It sits north to south, the roof is a beam-lifting frame, the single eaves rest on the top of the mountain, and the heads of animals such as lions and hippos are placed on the main ridge and vertical ridge. His Highness has a very high pedestal.

The main entrance of the Confucian Temple is the starting point of the central axis, with a width of more than 13 meters and a depth of more than 5 meters. In front of the door is a dismounting stele engraved with the theme of qin, chess, calligraphy and painting. On the east and west sides are the Manzi Gates, named "Ruihe" and "Fuzhen" respectively. The Guandi Hall has three rooms about 16 meters wide and less than 10 meters deep. It is rectangular, surrounded by 28 red columns and a corridor with a width of 1.5 meters. The animal heads on the roof ridge are lion, Tianma, hippopotamus, fish holding, and bullfighting. Among them, the ridge on the east is in disrepair, and the lion has fallen. The Dacheng Hall has three rooms over 16 meters wide and 11 meters deep. It is in the shape of a "convex", surrounded by a corridor composed of 30 red columns, the base is 0.8 meters high, and the beasts on the roof are dragons. In the hall, there are statues or reliefs of Confucius, Si Pei, and Twelve Philosophers. There are also plaques such as "The Master of the World" and "The Life and the People". There is a white elm tree in front of the door, named "Ancient and Famous Tree". The Bell and Drum Towers are symmetrical. The Bell Tower is in the east and the Drum Tower is in the west. It is a two-story building with four corners and spires. The first floor is placed with a bell or drum, and the second floor is empty. The platform is 0.45 meters high, surrounded by 16 red columns, and a corridor with a width of 1.5 meters. The front bay is 2.16 meters and has four doors. The sides are masonry gables with openwork windows, and the back is a grey solid brick wall.

Protect
In 1979, the Confucian Temple was designated as a municipal-level cultural relics protection unit in Urumqi. From 1988 to 1990, a large-scale maintenance and repair work was carried out with an investment of one million yuan. In 2013, the Urumqi Cultural Relics Bureau spent three months and spent 4 million yuan to repair the Confucian Temple. In 2014, the Confucian Temple was included in the seventh batch of autonomous region-level cultural relics protection units. In 2016, the tiles of the Confucian Temple in Urumqi fell off, and the Confucian Temple was closed for repair. On October 16, 2019, the Confucian Temple was listed as the eighth batch of national key cultural relics protection units.

The main function of Urumqi Confucian Temple is to worship Confucius and promote Confucian culture. However, it also shows the characteristics of "community of culture and martial arts", and the Confucian Temple also provides a sacrifice space for the two saints of both culture and martial arts. The Guandi Hall in the first half is the sacrifice space for "Wu Sheng", and the Dacheng Hall in the second half is the space for "Sacrificing Confucius". Other Han culture rituals have also been promoted here, such as the God of Wealth Temple, which is dedicated to the God of Wealth, the Taibaijinxing, the God of Earth, the Goddess of Mercy, and the Bell and Drum Tower, a typical building of traditional Chinese ritual system. In addition, the Urumqi Confucian Temple also hosts different festivals and celebrations. During the Lunar New Year and the Spring Festival, the Confucian Temple will hold temple fairs including social fire performances, sending Spring Festival couplets, etc., listening to opera and eating Lantern Festival on the Lantern Festival. Qingming Festival also held Qingming Poetry Festival and ancestor worship activities. During the Dragon Boat Festival, Zongzi are made in the Confucian Temple. During the Mid-Autumn Festival, people will worship the moon and make moon cakes in the Confucian Temple.

Photos

References

Buildings and structures in Ürümqi
Qing dynasty architecture
Confucian temples in China
18th-century establishments in China
18th-century Confucian temples
Traditional Chinese architecture
Major National Historical and Cultural Sites in Xinjiang